Yu Wai Seung (born 21 February 1972) is a Hong Kong judoka. She competed in the women's half-lightweight event at the 1992 Summer Olympics.

References

External links
 

1972 births
Living people
Hong Kong female judoka
Olympic judoka of Hong Kong
Judoka at the 1992 Summer Olympics
Place of birth missing (living people)
Judoka at the 1990 Asian Games
Asian Games medalists in judo
Asian Games bronze medalists for Hong Kong
Medalists at the 1990 Asian Games